Mount Prestley is a  triple-summit mountain located in the Valhalla Ranges of the Selkirk Mountains in British Columbia, Canada. Mount Prestley is the eighth-highest point in the Valhalla Ranges, with the highest being Gladsheim Peak,  to the east-northeast. Its nearest higher peak is Midgard Peak,  to the east. The mountain's name was officially adopted January 24, 1962, by the Geographical Names Board of Canada. It honors Canadian Army Private Michael Thomas Patrick Prestley, from Nelson, BC. He was serving with The Black Watch (Royal Highland Regiment) of Canada when he was killed in World War II action July 22, 1944, at age 21.

Based on the Köppen climate classification, Mount Prestley has a subarctic climate with cold, snowy winters, and mild summers. Temperatures can drop below −20 °C with wind chill factors below −30 °C. The months July through September offer the most favorable weather for climbing Mount Prestley. Precipitation runoff from the mountain drains into tributaries of the Slocan River.

Climbing routes
Established climbing routes on Mount Prestley:

 East Ridge -  First ascent 1969
 Central West Ridge

See also

Geography of British Columbia

References

External links
 Weather forecast: Mount Prestley  
 Flickr photo: Mount Prestley sunset
 Climbing information

Two-thousanders of British Columbia
Selkirk Mountains
Kootenay Land District